Joyce Helen Malecki (born June 12, 1949; disappeared November 11, 1969) was a 20-year-old American office worker from Baltimore, Maryland, who was employed at a liquor distributor. She disappeared on November 11, 1969, and was found dead two days later at the Soldier Park training area of Fort Meade. Malecki's murder remains unsolved; the Netflix documentary series The Keepers, released in May 2017, alleged a possible connection to the murder of Catherine Cesnik.

Biography
Joyce Malecki was born on June 12, 1949 in Baltimore County, Maryland, to Casimir Malecki Sr. (1919–1980) and Doris Marion Johnson (1924–2012). She had three brothers, Donald Joseph (1944–2016), Darryl, and Pat. Malecki was living in Lansdowne, on the 200 block of Laverne Avenue, and worked at a liquor distributor.

Disappearance and death 
On November 11, 1969, Malecki went Christmas shopping at Harundale Mall in Glen Burnie. She was wearing a brown turtleneck sweater and plaid slacks, and was scheduled to meet a boyfriend stationed at Fort Meade for a date, but never appeared. Malecki's disappearance occurred four days after the disappearance of Cathy Cesnik, a Catholic religious sister who taught at Archbishop Keough High School.

Two days after her disappearance, Malecki's body was discovered partially submerged on the bank of the Little Patuxent River, at Fort Meade's Soldier Park training area, by two hunters constructing a deer blind. She was found with her hands tied behind her back and with scratches and bruises on her body, indicating she had struggled with her assailant. An autopsy performed by Dr. Isidore Mihalakis indicated the cause of death was either by choking or drowning. A single deep knife wound found in Malecki's throat was insufficient to cause death. She had approximately "15 superficial cuts on the neck and abrasions on her forehead, nose and chin".

Malecki's body was found on federal property, and the case was therefore under FBI jurisdiction. At the time, FBI agents believed there was a possible link with Cesnik's disappearance: both women had been shopping in close proximity, had similar builds, and disappeared within days of each other. However, the Bureau was unable to conclusively link the two cases. Edwin R. Tully, special FBI agent in charge of the Baltimore field office, claimed to have a number of suspects. The Bureau remains the lead agency for this case, and despite information circulating online, the investigation has not been handed over to the Anne Arundel County Police Department.

Renewed interest
In 1994, Jean Hargadon Wehner and Teresa Lancaster, two former Keough students who suffered alleged sexual abuse at the hands of Father Joseph Maskell, brought a lawsuit against the Archdiocese of Baltimore. Wehner claimed to the Baltimore County Police Department (BCPD) that Maskell had driven her to a wooded area and shown her Cesnik's body. Consequently, the BCPD reopened Cesnik's case and reviewed a possible connection with Malecki's. Police received numerous telephone calls providing information regarding Cesnik's murder after local news reports about the allegations against Maskell renewed public interest. It was discovered that Malecki had spent time around Maskell. A second wave of interest was sparked after the release of the Netflix documentary series The Keepers in May 2017. 

Cesnik and Malecki's murders have been linked to two additional killings in the area. On October 16, 1970, 16-year-old Pamela Lynn Conyers disappeared from Harundale Mall. Her body was discovered less than a week later in Anne Arundel County, placed between the eastbound and westbound lanes of what was then Maryland Route 177 (now Maryland Route 100). On September 27, 1971, 16-year-old Grace Elizabeth "Gay" Montanye of Franklin High School disappeared from a shopping center in Reisterstown. Her body was found two days later by Mount Auburn Cemetery in South Baltimore.

Maskell's body was exhumed on February 28, 2017, for DNA testing involving the murder of Cesnik. Maskell's DNA did not match the forensic profile from 1970, but this is not enough to definitively discount him as a suspect.

See also
List of solved missing persons cases
List of unsolved murders

References

External links

1960s missing person cases
1969 in Maryland
1969 murders in the United States
November 1969 events in the United States
Female murder victims
Incidents of violence against women
Missing person cases in Maryland
People murdered in Maryland
Unsolved murders in the United States
Violence against women in the United States
Deaths from asphyxiation
History of women in Maryland
Baltimore County, Maryland